The Baja California collared lizard or Baja black-collared lizard (Crotaphytus vestigium) is a species of lizard in the family Crotaphytidae. The species is endemic to southern California (United States) and Baja California (Mexico).

Description
The Baja California collared lizard is a large-bodied species of lizard with a broad head, short snout, granular scales, and two distinct black collar markings. The collar markings are separated at the dorsal midline by more than 12 pale scales. It is tan to olive-colored with broad dark crossbands on its body. Young lizards look similar to adults, but with more distinct banding. The males of this species have enlarged postanal scales, a blue-grey throat, and large dark blotches on their flanks.

Behavior
C. vestigium is a powerful bipedal runner. Adults can inflict a painful bite.

Habitat
The Baja California collared lizard is uncommon. It prefers rocky areas, especially washes.

Conservation concerns
No major threats to C. vestigium have been identified, and it occurs in several protected areas.

References

Further reading
Smith HM, Brodie ED Jr (1982). Reptiles of North America: A Guide to Field Identification. New York: Golden Press. 240 pp.  (hardcover),  (paperback). (Crotaphytus insularis vestigium, pp. 108-109).
Smith NM, Tanner WW (1972) "Two new subspecies of Crotaphytus (Sauria: Iguanidae)". Great Basin Naturalist 32: 25-34. (Crotaphytus insularis vestigium, new subspecies, pp. 29-31, Figures 1-3).
Stebbins RC (2003). A Field Guide to Western Reptiles and Amphibians, Third Edition. The Peterson Field Guide Series ®. Boston and New York: Houghton Mifflin Company. xiii + 533 pp., 56 plates, 39 figures, 204 maps. . (Crotaphytus vestigium, p. 273 + Map 85).

Crotaphytus
Reptiles described in 1972
Taxa named by Wilmer W. Tanner
Reptiles of Mexico
Reptiles of the United States